Transgelin-2 is a protein that in humans is encoded by the TAGLN2 gene.

The protein encoded by this gene is a homolog of the protein transgelin, which is one of the earliest markers of differentiated smooth muscle. The function of this protein has not yet been determined.

References

Further reading